Nuelson Francisco Emanuel Wau (born 17 December 1980) is a former professional footballer who played as a right-back. Born in the Netherlands, he made two appearances for the Netherlands Antilles national team. His first professional match was on 22 April 2000.

References

External links
willem-ii.nl 

1980 births
Living people
People from Geldrop
Dutch people of Curaçao descent
Dutch footballers
Dutch Antillean footballers
Curaçao footballers
Association football defenders
Netherlands Antilles international footballers
Eredivisie players
Eerste Divisie players
Willem II (football club) players
PSV Eindhoven players
Nea Salamis Famagusta FC players
Dutch expatriate footballers
Dutch Antillean expatriate footballers
Dutch expatriate sportspeople in Cyprus
Expatriate footballers in Cyprus
Footballers from North Brabant
CRKSV Jong Colombia players